Jean Philippe Goujon de Grondel (November 27, 1714 in Saverne, Alsace – November 29, 1807 in Salins, France) was a French general.

He was sent as a young officer to Louisiana, where he distinguished himself in the wars against the Chickasaws and was wounded in the battle of Ackia in 1736. After his marriage in 1741, he was employed in various military expeditions and diplomatic negotiations with Native American peoples, until 1750 when he became a captain of the Swiss grenadiers of Louisiana, and was awarded the Cross of St. Louis for his services in 1753. In 1758, he settled as a planter in New Orleans, but the following year became embroiled in a quarrel with Governor Kerlerec, who accused him of insubordination and other offenses, for which he was thrown into prison for three years and, in 1762, deported back to France to be prosecuted.

In 1765, he was eventually imprisoned in the Bastille but only for two weeks. Judgment in his trial was finally rendered in 1769, in his favor. Soon after, he was appointed lieutenant-colonel. Louisiana having been ceded to Spain, Grondel was appointed in 1772 to the command of the naval base at Lorient, and rose to the rank of brigadier-general in 1788. In 1792, during the French Revolution, he was denounced as an aristocrat and thrown into prison, but once again for just a few days. Almost immediately upon his release he was elected by the inhabitants of Nemours as commanding general of the National Guards of their city, serving until the following year. Having quelled a riot in the town between rival military units by firmness and personal courage, he was voted thanks by the municipal authorities for his noble conduct.

In 1796, he retired to Salins, near Montereau-Fault-Yonne, and died in 1807 at the age of 93.

External links
Biographical sketch in Charles Gayarré's History of Louisiana'

Second Voyage à la Louisiane by Baudry des Lozières (1803)

1714 births
1819 deaths
People from Saverne
French generals
Pre-statehood history of Louisiana